Adam Puleo, better known by his alias Wooli, is an American Briddim, riddim and dubstep DJ and producer. He is known for the songs "Island" and "Another Me", with the prior being a collaboration with American dubstep producers Seven Lions and Trivecta and the latter being a collaboration with Seven Lions and Canadian producer and DJ Excision. "Island" peaked at the No. 20 position on Billboard's Dance/Electronic Digital Song Sales chart in early 2019. "Another Me" peaked on the Hot Dance/Electronic Songs at the No. 46 position in late 2019.

Early life
Puleo was first introduced to bass music with a mix produced by English drum and bass producer Andy C. After attending several Bassnectar shows and other electronic music festivals, he considered himself a "dubstep rave kid" since 2010, attending as many shows as possible.

Career

2016: "Gettin That", "DayDream", and "After All" remix
On August 18, 2016, Puleo released his remix of the song "Gettin That" originally by Dirty Audio & Rickyxsan as a free digital download. The future bass remix originally debuted on the BBC Radio 1 radio show Diplo & Friends. Jeffrey Yau of Your EDM noted the song's "percussion kicks, synth chords, and jersey club squeaks" and described the song as an "atomic bomb coupled with a meteor strike."

On October 4, Puleo collaborated with dubstep producer Jantsen to release the song "DayDream" via Good Enuff. Run the Trap's Peach Gallagher called it a "hard-hitting anthem that will have you headbanging in no time." Writing for ThisSongSlaps, Brian Bonavoglia commented that the song is "one of the hardest-hitting tunes we’ve heard in recent months."

On December 20, a remix extended play of the song "After All" by Slander and YOOKiE was released via Never Say Die. Puleo, in collaboration with Los Angeles-based dubstep producer Kompany, was featured on the extended play alongside other dubstep producers Habstrakt, Laxx, and Xilent. A VIP mix of the remix was later released on March 2, 2017.

2017: "Back / Like I Used To"
On July 7, 2017, Puleo released the single "Back / Like I Used To", featuring Eli Flynn as vocals on the latter, via Circus Records. Writing for Dancing Astronaut, Austin Evenson described "Back" as "ear-splitting", later saying that the song shined "his crisp yet thrashing drop of scraping, snarling composition." Noiseporn's Lennon Cihak talked about "Like I Used To", writing that it is smoother compared to "Back", noting it's the use of Eli Flynn's vocals and "superb guitar talents."

2018: "Falling", Mammoth, and SoundCloud
On May 21, 2018, American music producer Trivecta collaborated with Puleo to release the song "Falling" via Monstercat. The song has been described by writers of EDM Sauce and EDMTunes as a combination of both producer's respective styles, mixing bass-focused with melodic dubstep.

On July 3, English music producer and DJ Gammer released the first part of the remixes to his song "The Drop" via Monstercat. Various electronic music producers such as 4B, NvrLeft, Skellism, Slippy, and Stonebank, alongside Puleo, were featured on the remix extended play. ThisSongSlaps' Brian Bonavoglia stated that his remix was an "explosive rendition" of the original song, also describing it as "bone-rattling".

On September 26, English dubstep and drum and bass producer FuntCase released his collaboration with Puleo as part of the compilation album FuntCase Presents: DPMO, Vol. 2. The collaboration, titled "Man Don’t Want War" and featuring vocalist Clipson, was released as the compilation album's final single before release.

On October 5, Puleo released his second extended play Mammoth via Never Say Die. The four-track extended play included the songs "Throw It Up", "Elephant March", "Need U", and "Thicc Boi". Puleo created the extended play wanting to represent who he is as a person on and off stage, with it containing both "briddim" and melodic dubstep that is both emotional and personal to him.

On November 14, Quebec-based "vomitstep" producer Snails collaborated with Puleo to release the song "Snailephant" via Slugz Music. The song was released as a single off of Snails' extended play Slimeageddon.

In November, various bass music and dubstep musicians and producers had most or all of their songs from online audio distribution platform and music sharing website SoundCloud for wrongful copyright claims. Puleo was among these artists who had their songs removed. Speaking through Twitter, he released a statement concerning the claims, specifically noting his collaboration with Mastadon and hoping that the claims would get resolved quickly.

2019: "Island", "Another Me", Evolution EP and "Nothing Left"

On January 4, 2019, American DJ and record producer Seven Lions collaborated with Puleo and Trivecta to release the song "Island", featuring Nevve as vocals, via Seven Lions' record label Ophelia. Writing for Billboard, Dove Shore called it a "deft mix of styles and feelings" and called it "equal parts fantasy getaway and monstrous mood as glowing melodies soar between hard drops." Farrell Sweeney of Dancing Astronaut wrote that the song found "a way to meld blissful yet abrasive melodic dubstep elements together."

On August 30, Seven Lions collaborated with Canadian producer and DJ Excision and Puleo to release the song "Another Me" via Ophelia. Dancing Astronaut's Jessica Mao noted the song's "charged melodies, open-hearted vocals, and thundering bass" as the incorporation of each producer's respective styles. Matthew Meadow of Your EDM also noted the mix of the respective producers styles, writing that "the beautiful elements of each artist, every section of the track hits a bit different, whether on the melodic side or the downright dastardly bass-heavy side."

On September 13, Puleo released his third extended play Evolution via Never Say Die. The extended play was a collaboration between Puleo and Excision, containing four tracks, including the songs "Lockdown", "Oxygen", "Evolution", and the previously released "Another Me".

On October 25, Puleo released "Nothing Left" with William Black and RUNN via Ophelia.

Artistry
Puleo takes inspiration from songs outside of dubstep and riddim, such as film music, trance, and other melodic genres. He produces what he calls "briddim", a fusion subgenre of brostep and riddim that focuses on utilising heavier snares and kicks.

Various online music magazines have included Puleo in their "artists to watch" lists. Writers for Run the Trap, UKF, and EDMTunes had placed him in their lists for 2017, 2018, and 2019, respectively.

Discography

Albums and extended plays

As featured artist

Charted singles

Other singles

Remixes

References

Dubstep musicians
Future bass musicians
Living people
American DJs
American record producers
American male composers
21st-century American composers
American electronic musicians
21st-century American male musicians
Year of birth missing (living people)